Steinweiler is a municipality in the district of Germersheim, in Rhineland-Palatinate, Germany.

History 

Steinweiler was first created in 968 and was officially given the name "Steinweiler" in 1585. The oldest house in the village dates back to 1724; some others were built in the 1780s and 1790s.
There is a column called the "Napoleon's Column" which was erected because Napoleon is said to have walked through this area.

Economy 
Steinweiler is surrounded by farms that grow mainly wheat, barley, and corn. It is close to the wine growing region of Germany and hosts a wine festival every year. There is a pig farm in the area.  There are just over 1900 people living in Steinweiler.

References

Germersheim (district)